Xanthopleura perspicua is a moth in the subfamily Arctiinae first described by Francis Walker in 1856. It is found in Colombia, Ecuador and Pará, Brazil.

References

Arctiinae